Johann De Villiers 'Div' Visser  (born 26 November 1958 in Cape Town, South Africa is a former South African rugby union player.

Playing career
Visser played for Western Province in the South African Currie Cup competition. 
Visser made his debut for the Springboks during the 1981 tour of New Zealand in the second test on 29 August 1981 at Athletic Park, Wellington, New Zealand.  He also played in the Springboks' first ever test against the USA on 20 September 1981 at the Owl Creek Polo ground in Glenville, New York. Visser also played in 10 tour matches for the Springboks, in which he scored four tries.

Test history

See also
List of South Africa national rugby union players – Springbok no. 517

References

1958 births
Living people
South African rugby union players
South Africa international rugby union players
Rugby union locks
Western Province (rugby union) players
Rugby union players from Cape Town